The Cutting Edge: Going for the Gold is a 2006 American sports-romantic drama film, the sequel to The Cutting Edge (1992), and the second installment in The Cutting Edge film series. The film premiered on March 12, 2006 on ABC Family and released on DVD on March 28, 2006, receiving 3.4 million viewers.

Plot summary
Jaclyn "Jackie" Dorsey, the daughter of Olympic Gold medalists Doug Dorsey and Kate Moseley from the original film, also enters the figure skating field, with ambitions of winning her own Olympic gold. However, a serious injury derails that ambition. After months of training, Jackie is finally ready to skate again but has trouble keeping up with the rigorous demands of singles skating. Her parents send her on a vacation to Los Angeles, where she meets surfer boy/in-line skater Alex Harrison. Sparks fly between the two, but when Jackie sees how glamorous Alex's life as a pro in-line skater really is after finding out he works as a valet at her hotel, she brushes him off. This makes Alex mad, so when Jackie shows up at the beach, where they were supposed to meet for a date, and makes a half-hearted apology, the irritated Alex picks a fight and the two go fuming their separate ways.

In the meantime, Jackie realizes that, considering the circumstances, pairs skating will give her a better chance at Olympic gold. After many unsuccessful interviews with prospective partners, she becomes frustrated. Then, after Alex Harrison sees Jackie on TV, discussing her search for a partner, he shows up for an interview. Even though Alex has no experience and has trained for only a short time, he shows remarkable natural talent.

However, Jackie feels that Alex is lazy and unreliable. Inevitably, the two lock horns. They fight so constantly that Jackie's mother locks them together with a harness, forcing them to do everything together. After that, Jackie and Alex start to get along, and their attraction grows. But then, Alex's old girlfriend Heidi shows up and jeopardizes Alex and Jackie's chance at gold. After a blowout fight at regionals, Alex leaves. Jackie convinces him to return, but also learns that Heidi and Alex are engaged. Alex and Jackie train for the Olympics, which will be held in Torino, Italy. Later, while in Torino, Heidi lets it slip that they are getting married immediately after the closing ceremonies and that Alex will be hanging up his skates for good. This causes friction between Jackie and Alex, resulting in a passionless short program, and they end up in fourth place.

Jackie then reveals to her father that she still loves Alex, and her father convinces her to talk to him. Jackie goes to Alex's room and pours her heart out to someone that she thinks is Alex, but that person is actually Heidi. After hearing Jackie’s confession of love, Heidi locks the door and Jackie takes off. When Alex discovers what Heidi has done, he goes after her. Heidi tells him that if he leaves, she will not be there when he returns. He leaves anyway. Jackie refuses to talk to Alex, but right after their program begins, Alex tells Jackie that he is in love with her and that he wants to be with her for the rest of his life. Their long program is flawless and includes a move that has never been done before. In the final shot, Alex and Jackie are seen kissing.

Cast
 Christy Carlson Romano as Jaclyn Dorsey
 Ross Thomas as Alex Harrison
 Stepfanie Kramer as Kate Moseley-Dorsey
 Scott Thompson Baker as Doug Dorsey
 Kim Kindrick as Heidi Clements

Cameos
 Oksana Baiul (a former world champion) as a commentator.
 The film's director, Sean McNamara, as a guest waiting for his car. (Wearing an orange shirt in the scene just before Jackie and Alex have their first kiss.)
 Michael Kuluva as a figure skater trying out to be Jackie's pair partner.

Timeline
While the first film—starring Moira Kelly and D. B. Sweeney—was itself set in 1988 to 1992, the second film is clearly set during the run up to the 2006 Winter Olympics. This would make Jackie—played by then 21-year-old Romano–only 14 years old.

In an example of retroactive continuity, Going for the Gold is based on the assumption that the first film has been moved from 1992 to 1984. This was confirmed in an interview with Stepfanie Kramer, included on the DVD release of the first film. In the interview, Kramer says that the second film takes place more than 20 years after the events of the original.

References

External links
 
 

2006 television films
2006 films
2000s English-language films
Films about Olympic figure skating
ABC Family original films
American romantic drama films
Films shot in California
Films set in Connecticut
Films set in California
Films set in Chicago
Films set in Santa Monica, California
Films set in St. Louis
Films set in 2005
Films set in 2006
Films about the 2006 Winter Olympics
Films directed by Sean McNamara
2006 romantic drama films
Direct-to-video sequel films
Television sequel films
Metro-Goldwyn-Mayer films
2000s American films